The FruitGuys is a company headquartered in South San Francisco, California, that delivers fresh fruit to more than 3,000 businesses around the United States; catering to large corporations and small businesses alike, the company has counted among its clients companies ranging from Yahoo! to Wells Fargo to Yamaha. Founded by Chris Mittelstaedt, the company also has an East Coast hub in Philadelphia, Pennsylvania, and a Midwest hub in Chicago, Illinois.

From 2008 to 2011, The FruitGuys were recognized as part of the Inc. 5000 list of the fastest-growing businesses in the United States.

History
Entrepreneur Chris Mittelstaedt founded The FruitGuys in 1998. The idea surfaced as a response to complaints of weight gain and sluggishness by Mittelstaedt’s contacts at dot-com companies, who were overloading on soft drinks and snacks facing long hours in the office. Mittelstaedt believed he could boost wellness efforts in the workplace by delivering farm-fresh produce to employers, and started promoting these services within San Francisco’s Embarcadero Center. Along with cold-calling efforts, Mittelstaedt also made appearances in a banana suit on city streets to distribute free fruit and promulgate healthy eating habits. 

Though Mittelstaedt had somewhat of an uphill battle in light of the imminent dot-com bust and essentially starting the company from scratch, The FruitGuys is today considered a pioneer in its field, having spawned numerous competitors and spearheaded a general trend toward health awareness at work.  Scarcely a decade later, what started out as a two-person operation and an old Honda Civic filled with fruit has morphed into a multi-million dollar enterprise  employing approximately 40 staff

Its popularity can be attributed in part to the rise of workplace wellness programs and a collective desire to support local farms and organic food initiatives. Fruit is obtained locally in each region served by the FruitGuys, not only to support local agriculture but also to cut down on harmful emissions and ensure freshness.

Environmental efforts

According to the FruitGuys website, an integral part of the company’s socially responsible approach is its commitment to using eco-friendly packaging. All boxes used are made of 75 to 100 percent post-consumer recycled cardboard, printed with soy-based inks and reused up to four times. The company also uses a custom-made packaging machine that cuts down on cardboard use by 40 percent.

Community work
According to company founder Chris Mittelstaedt, his top priority is to keep community values and involvement at the core of the company’s mission. In April 2008, The FruitGuys launched the Farm Steward Program to support sustainable, small-family farming and to identify and meet individual farm needs. They began by donating four beehives with 48,000 honey bees to a Sebastopol, California farm to call attention to the growing national disappearance of honey bees. Other Farm Steward undertakings have included helping farmers plant new trees and installing four bat boxes for Bay area farms to attract bats, which act as natural insecticides.

In another philanthropic program, the company offers fruit at no cost to young female entrepreneurs in Bayview-Hunters Point, a low-income Bay area neighborhood where fresh produce makes up just 5 percent of the food sold in the local stores. The women then sell the fruit at low cost to neighborhood families as a means of developing entrepreneurial skills and bringing healthy fresh fruit to the community.

In addition to these projects, the company donates more than 80,000 pounds of fresh fruit a year (more than 7,000 pounds a month) to non-profit groups and regional food pantries in the United States, such as St. Anthony Foundation and Philabundance.

External links

http://www.glamour.com/health-fitness/blogs/vitamin-g/2008/12/afternoon-snack-talk-your-boss.html
http://www.mnn.com/food/farms-gardens/blogs/the-fruitguys-or-what-does-mango-really-taste-like
http://www.pressdemocrat.com/article/20080429/NEWS/550513156
http://www.sfgate.com/cgi-bin/article.cgi?f=/c/a/2006/10/28/MNGD7M1UNH1.DTL
http://www.cbsnews.com/video/watch/?id=16320371n&tag=mncol;lst;1

Notes

Retail companies based in California
Companies based in San Mateo, California
Food and drink in the San Francisco Bay Area
1998 establishments in California
Food and drink companies based in California